Alpine skiing at the 1964 Winter Olympics consisted of six events, held near Innsbruck, Austria, from January 30 to February 8, 1964.

The men's downhill was held on Patscherkofel (above Igls), the other five events at Axamer Lizum.

This was the first Olympics in which the finishing times were recorded in hundredths of a second, rather than tenths. It was the third and final Winter Olympics in which East and West Germany competed as the United Team of Germany. Mild weather led to a lack of snow, which was trucked in and packed down by the Austrian army.

During a training run for the men's downhill at Patscherkofel on January 25, Ross Milne of Australia lost control and left the course; he hit a tree and later died of a head injury.

The Winter Olympics returned to Innsbruck just 12 years later in 1976, after Denver returned its winning bid in November 1972 (Innsbruck was awarded the 1976 games in February 1973).

Medal summary
Four nations won medals in alpine skiing, with Austria leading the total medals with seven (three gold, two silver, and two bronze). France also had three gold, with three silver medals. France's Marielle and Christine Goitschel led the individual medal table, each with one gold and one silver. The top men's medalist was Austria's Pepi Stiegler, who won gold and bronze.

Medal table

Source:

Men's events

Source:

Women's events

Source:

Course information

Participating nations
Thirty-one nations sent alpine skiers to compete in the events in Innsbruck. India made its Olympic alpine skiing debut. Below is a list of the competing nations; in parentheses are the number of national competitors.

World championships
From 1948 through 1980, the alpine skiing events at the Winter Olympics also served as the World Championships, held every two years.  With the addition of the giant slalom, the combined event was dropped for 1950 and 1952, but returned as a World Championship event in 1954 as a "paper race" which used the results from the three events. During the Olympics from 1956 through 1980, World Championship medals were awarded by the FIS for the combined event. The combined returned as a separate event at the World Championships in 1982 and at the Olympics in 1988.

Combined

Men's Combined

Downhill: 30 January, Giant Slalom: 2 February, Slalom: 8 February

Women's Combined

Downhill: 6 February, Giant Slalom: 3 February, and Slalom: 1 February
Heidi Biebl of West Germany finished fourth in downhill and slalom but DQ'd in GS.

Footnotes
  Athletes from East and West Germany competed together as the United Team of Germany," designated as the EUA. This combined team appeared in the 1956, 1960, and 1964 Winter Olympics

References

External links
FIS-Ski.com – alpine skiing – 1964 Winter Olympics – Innsbruck, Austria
Winter map – Innsbruck area
Innsbruck – ski areas

 
1964 Winter Olympics events
Alpine skiing at the Winter Olympics
Winter Olympics
Alpine skiing competitions in Austria